In mathematics, the Dirichlet energy is a measure of how variable a function is.  More abstractly, it is a quadratic functional on the Sobolev space .  The Dirichlet energy is intimately connected to Laplace's equation and is named after the German mathematician Peter Gustav Lejeune Dirichlet.

Definition

Given an open set  and a function  the Dirichlet energy of the function  is the real number

where  denotes the gradient vector field of the function .

Properties and applications

Since it is the integral of a non-negative quantity, the Dirichlet energy is itself non-negative, i.e.  for every function .

Solving Laplace's equation  for all , subject to appropriate boundary conditions, is equivalent to solving the variational problem of finding a function  that satisfies the boundary conditions and has minimal Dirichlet energy.

Such a solution is called a harmonic function and such solutions are the topic of study in potential theory.

The solutions to the Lagrange equations for the sigma model Lagrangian are those functions   that minimize/maximize the Dirichlet energy. Restricting this general case back to the specific case of  just shows that the Lagrange equations (or, equivalently, the Hamilton–Jacobi equations) provide the basic tools for obtaining extremal solutions.

See also 
 Dirichlet's principle
 Dirichlet eigenvalue
 Total variation
 Oscillation
 Harmonic map

References

Calculus of variations
Partial differential equations